The banana climbing mouse (Dendromus messorius) is a species of rodent in the family Nesomyidae. It is found in Benin, Cameroon, Democratic Republic of the Congo, Nigeria, and Togo. Its natural habitat is subtropical or tropical dry lowland grassland.

References
Musser, G. G. and M. D. Carleton. 2005. Superfamily Muroidea. pp. 894–1531 in Mammal Species of the World a Taxonomic and Geographic Reference. D. E. Wilson and D. M. Reeder eds. Johns Hopkins University Press, Baltimore.
 Schlitter, D. & Dieterlen, F. 2004.  Dendromus messorius.   2006 IUCN Red List of Threatened Species.  Downloaded on 9 July 2007.

Dendromus
Rodents of Africa
Mammals described in 1903
Taxa named by Oldfield Thomas
Taxonomy articles created by Polbot